Lambri Kamara is a form of a Greek folk dance from Megara, Attika, Greece.

See also
Music of Greece
Greek dances

References
Λαμπρή Καμάρα

Greek dances